Warren Brooks Woodson (February 24, 1903 – February 22, 1998) was an American football, basketball, and baseball coach and college athletics administrator.  He served as the head football coach at Arkansas State Teachers College, now the University of Central Arkansas, (1935–1940), Hardin–Simmons University (1941–1951), the University of Arizona (1952–1956), New Mexico State University (1958–1967), and Trinity University in San Antonio, Texas (1972–1973), compiling a career college football record of 203–94–14 in 31 seasons.  He was also the head basketball coach at Arkansas State Teachers from 1935 to 1941 and at Hardin–Simmons in 1945–46, tallying a career college basketball mark of 116–50.  Woodson won an additional 52 football games at junior college level and 18 high school football games.  He was inducted to the College Football Hall of Fame in 1989.

Education and coaching career
Woodson received a degree from Baylor University in 1924, majoring in Bible and history, and a degree from Springfield College in 1926, majoring in physical education. He coached four sports at Texarkana College from 1927 to 1934 and, in three of the same years also coached three sports at a nearby high school.

He then moved on to Arkansas State Teachers College (now University of Central Arkansas) in Conway from 1935 to 1940. In his second year, his team had a perfect 8–0 season. Won 2000 Elijah Pitts Award (named after the Conway, Arkansas, native and Green Bay Packer legend) for Conway athletic lifetime achievement.

Woodson accepted the head coaching job at Hardin–Simmons University in 1941. During World War II, Woodson served for three years as a lieutenant commander in the United States Navy. The Hardin-Simmons football program was canceled from 1943 to 1945. After Woodson returned, his 1946 team went unbeaten with an 11–0 record. His 1948 team was in three bowls: the Grape Bowl on December 4, a 35–35 tie with College of the Pacific; the Shrine Bowl December 18, a 40–12 victory over Ouachita Baptist; and Camellia Bowl December 30, a 49–12 victory over Wichita.

Woodson coached at the University of Arizona from 1952 to 1956 and at New Mexico State University from 1958 to 1967. His 1960 team went 11–0. He was head coach at Trinity University in San Antonio, Texas from 1972 to 1973 and later was consultant at New Mexico Highlands.

Woodson coached players who won the national rushing title nine times:
 Rudolph Mobley, Hardin–Simmons (1942, 1946)
 Wilton Davis, Hardin–Simmons (1947)
 Art Luppino, Arizona (1954, 1955)
 Pervis Atkins, New Mexico State (1959)
 Bob Gaiters, New Mexico (State 1960)
 Jim Pilot, New Mexico State (1961, 1962)

Death
Woodson died of colon cancer on February 22, 1998, at his home in Dallas, Texas.

Head coaching record

College football

See also
 List of college football coaches with 200 wins

Notes

References

External links
 
 

1903 births
1998 deaths
Arizona Wildcats football coaches
Central Arkansas Bears baseball coaches
Central Arkansas Bears basketball coaches
Central Arkansas Bears football coaches
Hardin–Simmons Cowboys and Cowgirls athletic directors
Hardin–Simmons Cowboys football coaches
Hardin–Simmons Cowboys basketball coaches
High school football coaches in Texas
Junior college football coaches in the United States
New Mexico State Aggies athletic directors
New Mexico State Aggies football coaches
Trinity Tigers athletic directors
Trinity Tigers football coaches
Baylor University alumni
Springfield College (Massachusetts) alumni
United States Navy officers
United States Navy personnel of World War II
Sportspeople from Fort Worth, Texas
Coaches of American football from Texas
Basketball coaches from Texas
Deaths from cancer in Texas
Deaths from colorectal cancer
Military personnel from Texas